Faison may refer to:

People 

 Donald Faison (born 1974), American actor
 Dorothy Faison (born 1955), American artist
 Frankie Faison (born 1949), American film actor
 Jeremy Faison (born 1976), American politician
 Samson L. Faison (18601940), American general

Other uses 

 Cesar Faison, a fictional villain on the American daytime drama General Hospital
 Faison, North Carolina, an American town